This is a list of cumulative spacewalk records for the 30 astronauts who have the most extra-vehicular activity (EVA) time. The record is currently held by Anatoly Solovyev of the Russian Federal Space Agency, with 82:22 hours from 16 EVAs, followed by NASA's Michael Lopez-Alegria with 67:40 hours in 10 EVAs. This list is current as of March 1, 2022. The RSA designation includes spacewalks under the earlier Soviet space program.

List

Notes 

Behnken and Cassidy are the first to complete 10 spacewalks in NASA EMU suits. Whitson and López-Alegría used Russian Orlan Space Suits for some of their spacewalks: López-Alegría completed 2 and Whitson completed 1 spacewalk(s) with an Orlan Space Suit.

See also
 Manned Maneuvering Unit
 Space suit
 List of spacewalkers
 List of spacewalks and moonwalks 1965–1999
 List of spacewalks 2000–2014
 List of spacewalks since 2015

References 

Human spaceflight
Extravehicular activity
Cumulative spacewalk records
Spacewalk